The Azwafit or Azwafayt is a tribe of bedouin (nomad) Arab origin.

Etymology 
The word "Azwafit" is derived from the Arabic word "zfata", means "To protect from the Zfata". The Zfata is a group of people which claim false payments for the transportation of goods.

About 
The Azwafit are part of the greater Tekna confederation. Azwafit is a tribe which was accustomed to escort and protect caravans against the payment of "Ztata" or "Zfata", where the name Azwafit comes from. Because they became part of a bigger Berber tribe, the Arab subtribes are partially Berberised and speak Berber today.

The writer La Chapelle noted that Azwafits counted the following fractions: Ait Ahmed Ou Ali, Ahl Hayin, Mhamd Ait Ait El Khennous, Ait Messaoud Ait Boukko and Ida Ou Louggan.

See also 
 North African Arabs
 Idrissid 
 Beni Hassan 
 Maqil 
 Beni Khirane

References 

Arab tribes in Morocco